Lourdes (also ,) is a market town situated in the Pyrenees. It is part of the Hautes-Pyrénées department in the Occitanie region in southwestern France. Prior to the mid-19th century, the town was best known for its Château fort, a fortified castle that rises up from a rocky escarpment at its center.

In 1858 Lourdes rose to prominence in France and abroad due to the Marian apparitions claimed to have been seen by the peasant girl Bernadette Soubirous, who was later canonized. Shortly thereafter the city with the Sanctuary of Our Lady of Lourdes became one of the world's most important sites of pilgrimage and religious tourism.

History

Antiquity
The current municipal area of Lourdes was inhabited in prehistoric times. In Roman times it had to be, since the first century BC, an oppidum hill where today stands the fortress, as is testified by the numerous finds that came to light in the second half of the nineteenth century (remains of walls, fragments of a citadel, a pagan temple dedicated to the gods of water). Its buildings were discovered soon after the demolition of the parish of Saint Pierre (which took place in the early twentieth century), along with remains of pottery and three votive altars. In the fifth century, the temple was replaced by an early Christian church, destroyed later because of a fire. In the immediate vicinity of the place of worship was a necropolis of whose date and size there are no notes. The presence in the locality of a Roman road (and a possible second path perpendicular to the previous one) that connected the Pyrenean piedmont with Narbonne led to the hypothesis that the town could match quell'oppidum novum mentioned in the Antonine Itinerary.

From 732 to 778, Lourdes was possessed by Muslims of Al-Andalus. However, during the 8th century, Lourdes and its fortress became the focus of skirmishes between Mirat, the Muslim local leader, and Charlemagne, King of the Franks. Charlemagne had been laying siege to Mirat in the fortress for some time, but the Moor had so far refused to surrender. According to legend, an eagle unexpectedly appeared and dropped an enormous trout at the feet of Mirat. It was seen as such a bad omen that Mirat was persuaded to surrender to the Queen of the Sky by the local bishop. He visited the Black Virgin of Puy to offer gifts, so he could make sure this was the best course of action and, astounded by its exceptional beauty, he decided to surrender the fort and converted to Christianity. On the day of his baptism, Mirat took on the name of Lorus, which was given to the town, now known as Lourdes.

Middle Ages
Little is known of Lourdes in the period from the barbarian invasions to the Carolingian period when the town was part of the County of Bigorre. The fortress was at times the seat of counts and, during the Albigensian Crusade, it was the subject of disputes between various local lords. Ultimately it came under the domination of the Counts of Champagne. In the fourteenth century Lourdes was first occupied by Philip the Fair, then, during the Hundred Years' War, by the English, who controlled it for nearly half a century, from 1360 to 1407, through local feudal lords such as Pierre Arnaud de Béarn and, later, his brother Jean de Béarn. The English were able to take advantage of the excellent strategic situation and the prosperity of an eleventh century market that had been increasingly consolidated thanks to its proximity and good communications with Toulouse and Spain, managing to secure important gains for those who held the town. In the town, which developed in the valley, east of the fort, there were 243 fires at the beginning of the fifteenth century, compared to 150 of the thirteenth century.

After being the residency of the Bigorre counts, Lourdes was given to England by the Brétigny Treaty which bought a temporary peace to France during the course of the Hundred Years War with the result that the French lost the town to the English, from 1360. In 1405, Charles VI laid siege to the castle during the course of the Hundred Years War and eventually captured the town from the English following the 18-month siege.

Modern Age

During the late 16th century, France was ravaged by the Wars of Religion between the Roman Catholics and the Huguenots. In 1569, Count Gabriel de Montgomery attacked the nearby town of Tarbes when Queen Jeanne d’Albret of Navarre established Protestantism there. The town was overrun, in 1592, by forces of the Catholic League and the Catholic faith was re-established in the area. In 1607 Lourdes finally became part of the Kingdom of France.

The castle became a jail under Louis XV but, in 1789, the General Estates Assembly ordered the liberation of prisoners. Following the rise of Napoleon in 1803, he again made the Castle an Estate jail. Towards the end of the Peninsular War between France, Spain, Portugal, and Britain in 1814, British and Allied forces, under the Duke of Wellington, entered France and took control of the region and followed Marshall Soult's army, defeating the French near the adjoining town of Tarbes before the final battle, outside Toulouse on 10 April 1814, brought the war to an end.

Up until 1858, Lourdes was a quiet, modest, country town with a population of around 4,000. The castle was occupied by an infantry garrison. The town was a place people passed through on their way to the waters at Barèges, Cauterets, Luz-Saint-Sauveur and Bagnères-de-Bigorre, and for mountaineers on their way to Gavarnie.

Then on 11 February 1858, a 14-year-old local girl, Bernadette Soubirous, claimed a beautiful lady appeared to her in the remote Grotto of Massabielle. This lady later identified herself as the Immaculate Conception and the faithful believed her to be the Blessed Virgin Mary. The lady appeared 18 times, and by 1859 thousands of pilgrims were visiting Lourdes. A statue of Our Lady of Lourdes was erected at the site in 1864.

During World War II, pilgrimage to Lourdes declined dramatically as hotels and other accommodation was requisitioned, and travel became difficult. Despite this, Lourdes became a focus for religious resistance. Refugees from Lorraine visited in 1941, led by their own exiled bishop Joseph Jean Heintz. Lourdes was the destination for a tour of the statue of Our Lady of Boulogne (known as Le Grand Retour) which aimed to secure the spiritual salvation of France. In 1944, a peace pilgrimage to Lourdes took place. Even when war ended, pilgrimages took a while to return to their pre-war levels as the usual trains and pilgrimage ships were in use elsewhere, or destroyed. 

Since the apparitions, Lourdes has become one of the world's leading Catholic Marian shrines. Pope John Paul II visited the shrine twice, on 15 August 1983, and 14–15 August 2004. In 2007, Pope Benedict XVI authorized special indulgences to mark the 150th anniversary of Our Lady of Lourdes.

Geography

Lourdes is located in southern France in the foothills of the Pyrenees mountains near the prime meridian. The Grand Jer is accessible via the funicular railway of the Pic du Jer. The Béout was once accessible by cable car, although this has fallen into disrepair. A pavilion is still visible on the summit.

The Gave then branches off to the west towards the Béarn, running past the banks of the Grotto and on downstream to Pau and then Biarritz.

On land bordered by a loop of the Gave de Pau is an outcrop of rock called Massabielle (from masse vieille: "old mass"). On the northern aspect of this rock, near the riverbank, is a naturally occurring, irregularly shaped shallow cave or grotto, in which the apparitions of 1858 took place.

Apparitions and pilgrimages 

According to believers, the Virgin Mary appeared to Maria Bernada Sobirós (in her native Occitan language) on a total of eighteen occasions at Lourdes (Lorda in her local Occitan language). Lourdes has become a major place of Roman Catholic pilgrimage and of miraculous healings. The 150th Jubilee of the first apparition took place on 11 February 2008 with an outdoor Mass attended by approximately 45,000 pilgrims.

Today Lourdes has a population of around 15,000, but it is able to take in some 5,000,000 pilgrims and tourists every season. With about 270 hotels, Lourdes has the second greatest number of hotels per square kilometer in France after Paris. Some of the deluxe hotels like Grand Hotel Moderne, Hotel Grand de la Grotte, Hotel St. Étienne, Hotel Majestic and Hotel Roissy are located here.

In the evening of February 11, 1858, a young Roman Catholic girl, Bernadette, went to fetch some firewood with her sister and another companion when a Lady who was indescribably beautiful appeared to her at the Massabielle grotto. Although the Lady did not tell Bernadette her name when asked at first, she told her to return to the grotto. On subsequent visits, the Lady revealed herself to be the "Immaculate Conception". This was a reference to the dogma of the Immaculate Conception which had been defined only four years earlier in 1854 by Pope Pius IX, stating that the Virgin Mary herself had been conceived without sin. Bernadette, having only a rudimentary knowledge of the Catholic faith, did not understand what this meant but she reported it to her parish priest, Father Peyremale. He, though initially very skeptical of Bernadette's claims, became convinced when he heard this because he knew the young girl had no knowledge of the doctrine. The Lady also told Bernadette to dig in the ground at a certain spot and to drink from the small spring of water that began to bubble up. Almost immediately cures were reported from drinking the water. Today thousands of gallons of water gush from the source of the spring, and pilgrims are able to bathe in it. Countless purported miracle cures have been documented there, from the healing of nervous disorders and cancers to cases of paralysis and even of blindness. During the Apparitions, Bernadette Soubirous prayed the Rosary. Pope John Paul II wrote: "The Rosary of the Virgin Mary [is] a prayer of great significance, destined to bring forth a harvest of holiness".

Climate
The climate of Lourdes, due to the proximity of the city to the Atlantic, is oceanic (Cfb in the Köppen climate classification). The summers are warm, the autumn and spring mild, while winter is cool. Because of the proximity of the city to the Pyrenees, Lourdes, like other areas of the Pyrenean Piedmont, however, can be affected in winter by sporadic waves of frost: in January 1985 the thermometer marked -17° Fahrenheit, -27°C (historical record from 1934 to the present). A summer temperature of 102° Fahrenheit, 39 °C, was recorded in August 2003.

Sanctuary of Lourdes

Yearly from March to October the Sanctuary of Our Lady of Lourdes is a place of mass pilgrimage from Europe and other parts of the world. The spring water from the grotto is believed by some Catholics to possess healing properties.

An estimated 200 million people have visited the shrine since 1860, and the Roman Catholic Church has officially recognized 69 healings considered miraculous.
Cures are examined using Church criteria for authenticity and authentic miracle healing with no physical or psychological basis other than the healing power of the water.

Tours from all over the world are organized to visit the Sanctuary. Connected with this pilgrimage is often the consumption of or bathing in the Lourdes water which wells out of the Grotto.

At the time of the apparitions, the grotto was on common land which was used by the villagers variously for pasturing animals and collecting firewood, and it possessed a reputation for being an unpleasant place.

Ukrainian Church
The five-domed St. Mary's Ukrainian Catholic Church in Lourdes was designed by Myroslav Nimciv, while its Byzantine interior polychrome decorations were executed by artist Jerzy Nowosielski and the iconostasis by Petro Kholodny. The church was consecrated in 1982. It is about a 10-minute walk from the basilica and the grotto, on a street named in honour of Ukraine, 8 Rue de l'Ukraine, situated on a narrow piece of property close to the railroad station. Visible from the basilica, the height of the building makes up for its narrow breadth.

Population

International relations

Lourdes is twinned with:
 Basilica of Our Lady of Good Health in Vailankanni, Tamil Nadu, India
 Częstochowa in Poland
 Fátima in Portugal
 Loreto in Italy
 Altötting in Germany
 Cheyenne in Wyoming, United States
 Mariazell in Austria

Sport
Although the town is most famous for its shrines it is also notable for its Rugby union team, FC Lourdes, which during the mid-twentieth century was one of the most successful teams in France, winning the national championship eight times from 1948 to 1968. Their most famous player is Jean Prat, who represented his country 51 times.

There is also an amateur association football team in the town.

Since 2015, the local mountain biking course has been home to a UCI Downhill World Cup round each season.

In arts and fiction 

 Émile Zola (1840–1902) wrote the 1884 novel Lourdes that deals with faith and healing, particularly of Marie de Guersaint.
 The 1943 film Song of Bernadette, based on the 1941 novel by Franz Werfel which tells of the occurrences at Lourdes, won four Academy Awards in 1944. Producer William Perlberg carefully re-created the appearance of the town and outlying rural areas using a golf course.
 In 1960, Andy Williams released his album The Village of St. Bernadette, which featured the 1959 song "The Village of St. Bernadette".
 The film Behold a Pale Horse (1963), directed by Fred Zinnemann and starring Gregory Peck, Anthony Quinn, and Omar Sharif, includes a scene in Lourdes that is crucial to the plot. The scene was shot on location and includes actual pilgrims visiting the basilica.
 The 1984 book The Miracle by Irving Wallace is speculative fiction based on the story of St. Bernadette.
 The 2007 film The Diving Bell and the Butterfly features a flashback in which Jean-Dominique Bauby travels to Lourdes with a girlfriend and walks through the streets of the town.

Transport

(Many visitors also fly to Pau Pyrénées Airport.) This airport is served by Ryanair from London Stansted, Dublin, Lisbon, Kraków and Milan Bergamo, and three other airlines: AlbaStar, Austrian and Volotea. The airport also offers seasonal charter flights to and from the largest European cities. The town's railway station Gare de Lourdes is served by SNCF and TGV trains, including a high-speed TGV service from Paris which takes four-and-a-half hours. Many pilgrims also arrive via bus service from France and Spain.

Education
Lourdes has two main schools, one public and one private. The private school, the "Lycée Peyramale St Joseph", was founded by two monks just two years before the apparitions; it is named after the priest Dominique Peyramale, who was present during the apparitions. It celebrated its 150th anniversary in 2007. The newer public school is called the "Lycée de Sarsan".

Museums
 Wax Museum
 Pyrenean Museum
 Museum of the Nativity
 Museum of small Lourdes

See also
 Sanctuary of Our Lady of Lourdes
 Château fort de Lourdes
 Communes of the Hautes-Pyrénées department
 Lourdes apparitions
 Lourdes effect
 Shrines to the Virgin Mary
 "The Village of Saint Bernadette" (1959 song)
 Rosary

References

Bibliography
 Collectif, Lourdes de la Préhistoire à nos jours, Musée Pyrénéen, 1987.
 Laurence Catinot-Crost, Autrefois Lourdes, Éditions Atlantica, 2005.
 Sébastien Barrère, Petite histoire de Lourdes, Cairn, 2014.

External links

 Sanctuary of Our Lady of Lourdes – Official website
 The Grotto of the Apparitions – Online transmissions
 The cures at Lourdes recognised as miraculous by the Church 
 Lourdes Tourist Office
 Lourdes, by Robert Hugh Benson, 1914, from Project Gutenberg
 Catholic Association UK, details more information on Lourdes.

 Documentary Film about Lourdes 
 Museum of Lourdes/Le-Petit-Lourdes Museum  (in French)
 , video of Andy Williams' performance

 
Catholic pilgrimage sites
Communes of Hautes-Pyrénées
Shrines to the Virgin Mary
Our Lady of Lourdes
Catholic Church in France
Cities in Occitania (administrative region)